"Was That My Life" is a song recorded by American country music artist Jo Dee Messina. It was released on January 18, 2003 as the first single from her Greatest Hits compilation album. The song reached #21 on the Billboard Hot Country Singles & Tracks chart. The song was written by Marv Green and Bill Luther.

Chart performance

References

2003 singles
2003 songs
Jo Dee Messina songs
Songs written by Marv Green
Songs written by Bill Luther (songwriter)
Song recordings produced by Byron Gallimore
Song recordings produced by Tim McGraw
Curb Records singles